Tubarão (lit. "shark") is a Brazilian municipality located in southern part of Santa Catarina state. The population, according to the IBGE/2020 estimate was 106,422.  It is the main city of the Tubarão River basin region, which comprises 20 municipalities and a population of 350,000 inhabitants.

History

Tubarão was named after a native tribal chief called Tubanharô, which means "ferocious father" in Guaraní language. Thus, it does not have any relation to the word tubarão ("shark" in Portuguese).

The first settlement, which later became the city, was founded in 1773 by troopers as a halfway point between Laguna and the uplands.

Coal was discovered in Tubarão outskirts in the 18th century.

The city emancipated from Laguna in 1870.

In the following years Italian and German immigrants came to this region.

The Tereza Christina Railway was inaugurated in 1884.

One of the worst natural catastrophes in Brazil took place in Tubarão, on March 28, 1974. The Tubarão River waters flooded about 80% of the urban area. The disaster caused 199 fatalities and left about 45,000 people homeless.

Geography

The city is located 133 kilometers south of Florianópolis, the state capital, in the South Brazilian coast plains. Its urban area is crossed by the Tubarão River and, in parallel, the BR-101 federal highway. Some lakes and swamp areas are found in the surrounding areas, although its landscape has been modified several times by human activity. The climate is subtropical (Köppen climate classification).

Neighbor cities are Laguna, Capivari de Baixo, Gravatal, Pedras Grandes, Jaguaruna, São Ludgero, Orleans and Treze de Maio.

Economy

The main economy is based on agriculture (rice plantations), furniture industry and ceramic tiles. Tourism is also important due to its thermal water resources in Rio do Pouso and Guarda da Margem Esquerda localities.

Notable people

Arts
 Luiz Henrique Rosa (1938–1985) - musician and soccer player
 Willy Zumblick (1913–2008) - painter

Literature
 Alberto Cargnin (1925–2007) - romancist and journalist

Sports
 Renan Bressan (1988) - soccer player (Belarus national)
 Zenon (1954) - soccer player
 Marquinhos Pedroso - soccer player

Politics
 Heriberto Hülse (1902–1972) - Governor of Santa Catarina 1958–1961

Demography

The main ethnic groups are Portuguese-Azorians, German and Italian descendants and Afro-Brazilians. Tubarão is 12th largest city in the state. The total population (IBGE/2010) was 97,281.

The most illustrious citizen was Willy Zumblick, a painter of German descent. A museum in the downtown area is named after him.

Sport
The local association football teams are Clube Atlético Tubarão and Hercílio Luz Futebol Clube, two of the major teams of southern Santa Catarina.

See also
 Port of Tubarao
Aikanã, an indigenous people of the Brazil's Amazonian lowlands, also called Tubarão

References

External links
 City hall site
 UNISUL - Universidade do Sul de Santa Catarina, local university
 Tubarão Touristic site (in Portuguese)
 Notisul - local newspaper (in Portuguese)
 Diário do Sul - local newspaper (in Portuguese)

Municipalities in Santa Catarina (state)